The Frog Prince: The Original Soundtrack Recording is a soundtrack album to the English and French produced romantic comedy film The Frog Prince (1984), released in 1985 by Island Visual Arts, a subsidiary label of Island Records. The music was composed by Irish singer, songwriter and musician Enya, but only two of its tracks, "The Frog Prince" and "Dreams", were performed by her with the remaining tracks performed by other musicians or arranged and produced by Richard Myhill; several jazz standards are also performed. It was reissued in August 1999 by Spectrum Music.

Track listing

Personnel
Enya – lead vocals ("The Frog Prince" and "Dreams"), various instruments

Additional personnel
Jazz Club – performer on "Mack the Knife", "Let It Be Me", "Sweet Georgia Brown", and "Georgia on My Mind"
Édith Piaf – lead vocals ("Les Flon-Flons du Bal")
Roma Ryan – lyrics ("The Frog Prince")
Charlie McGettigan – lyrics ("Dreams")

Production
Nicky Ryan – producer ("The Frog Prince" and "Dreams")
Richard Myhill – producer, arranger (Enya-composed tracks)
Philip Begley – engineer (Enya-composed tracks)
Steve Allan – engineer
Andrew Boland – mixer (Enya-composed tracks)

External links

Enya soundtracks
1985 soundtrack albums
1999 soundtrack albums
Comedy film soundtracks